Kiakola (also Romanized as Kīākolā, Kīā Kolā, Kīā Kalā, and Kīyā Kalā; formerly, Jadīd ol Eslām) is a city and capital of Simorgh County, Mazandaran Province, Iran.  At the 2006 census, its population was 7,364, in 1,980 families.

References

Populated places in Simorgh County
Cities in Mazandaran Province